A ration stamp, ration coupon, or ration card is a stamp or card issued by a government to allow the holder to obtain food or other commodities that are in short supply during wartime or in other emergency situations when rationing is in force. Ration stamps were widely used during World War II by both sides after hostilities caused interruption to the normal supply of goods. They were also used after the end of the war while the economies of the belligerents gradually returned to normal. Ration stamps were also used to help maintain the amount of food one could hold at a time. This was so that one person would not have more food than another.

India

Rationing has been present in India since World War II. A ration card allows households to purchase highly subsidised food grain, sugar and kerosene from their local Public distribution system (PDS) shop.

There are two types of ration cards:
 Priority ration cards (replaced the erstwhile above poverty line and below poverty line ration cards after the enactment of the National Food Security Act in 2013)
 Antyodaya (AAY) ration cards, issued to the "poorest of the poor"

United States

Rationing was used in the United States during World War II.

Government funds provided to poverty stricken individuals by the Supplemental Nutrition Assistance Program are often referred to colloquially as "food stamps". The parallels between these "food stamps" and ration stamps as used in war time rationing is limited, however, since food can be purchased in the United States on the regular market without the use of stamps.

United Kingdom

Rationing was widespread in the United Kingdom during World War II and continued long after the end of the war. It has been credited with greatly increasing public health. Fuel rationing did not end until 1950.

Poland
Ration cards were used in the Polish People's Republic in two periods: April 1952 to January 1953 and August 1976 to July 1989.

If one were to buy more food than specified on the stamp, they had to pay 2.5 times the price.

See also
 Rationing

References 

Home front during World War II
Military logistics
Disaster preparedness
Philatelic terminology
Cinderella stamps
Rationing